Roger L. Hunt (born 1942) is an inactive Senior United States district judge of the United States District Court for the District of Nevada.

Education and career

Born in Overton, Nevada, Hunt received a Bachelor of Arts degree from Brigham Young University in 1966 and a Juris Doctor from the George Washington University Law School in 1970. He was a deputy district attorney at the Clark County District Attorney's Office from 1970 to 1971. He was in private practice in Las Vegas Valley, Nevada from 1971 to 1992.

Federal judicial service

Hunt serves on the United States District Court for the District of Nevada. Hunt was nominated by President Bill Clinton on March 27, 2000, to a new seat created by 113 Stat. 1501. He was confirmed by the United States Senate on May 24, 2000, and received his commission the next day. He served as Chief Judge from 2007 to 2011. Prior to his appointment, he had been a United States magistrate judge on that court from 1992 to 2000. Hunt took senior status on May 26, 2011. He was succeeded by Miranda Du.

Religion

Hunt is a member of the Church of Jesus Christ of Latter-day Saints. He has also served as a stake president.

Sources

LDS Church Almanac, 2008 Edition, p. 246-247.

1942 births
Living people
People from Clark County, Nevada
American leaders of the Church of Jesus Christ of Latter-day Saints
Brigham Young University alumni
George Washington University Law School alumni
Judges of the United States District Court for the District of Nevada
United States district court judges appointed by Bill Clinton
United States magistrate judges
Latter Day Saints from Nevada
20th-century American judges
21st-century American judges